Naryn (Mongolian : Нарийн, Nariin,  Traditional Mongolian ᠨᠠᠷᠢᠨ)   is the regional administrative center of Naryn Region in central Kyrgyzstan. The town was established as a fortress on the caravan route in 1868. It is situated on both banks of the river Naryn (one of the main head waters of the Syr Darya), which cuts a picturesque gorge through the town. The city has two regional museums and some hotels, but is otherwise residential.

History

Naryn was established as a fortress on the important caravan route between Kashgar and Zhetysu (Semirechye) at the direction of the first Governor-General of Russian Turkestan Konstantin Petrovich von Kaufmann in 1868.

Overview
From Naryn, the main road (one of the branches of the ancient Silk Road) runs south through the sparsely settled central Kyrgyz highlands to the Torugart Pass and China. At present, this is the main transport link from Kyrgyzstan to China.
Naryn hosts one of three campuses of the University of Central Asia (UCA). The university was founded in 2000 by the governments of Kazakhstan, the Kyrgyz Republic and Tajikistan, and His Highness the Aga Khan. It is the world's first internationally chartered institution of higher education. The UCA currently operates a School of Professional and Continuing Education (SPCE), with a School of Undergraduate Studies and a Graduate School of Development in the process of being established. Undergraduate classes at the University of Central Asia’s (UCA) Naryn, Kyrgyz Republic campus commenced on 5 September 2016.

The city has a bandy club.

Demographics
Naryn is the tenth largest city by population in Kyrgyzstan. Its resident population, according to the Population and Housing Census of 2009, was 34,822. According to the National Statistical Committee the population of Naryn amounted to 41,178 as of January 2021.

Economics
The economy of the Province is dominated by animal husbandry such as horse, sheep and yak, and wool and meat being the main products. Today, the district is the poorest region in the country. The mineral mines developed during the Soviet period were largely abandoned after the fall of communism as they were not profitable.

Climate 
Naryn has a cold semi-arid climate (Köppen climate classification BSk) with strong continental tendencies.

References

External links

Celestial Mountains Travel Encyclopedia of Kyrgyzstan [English]
Photos from Naryn [English]

Populated places in Naryn Region
Populated places along the Silk Road
Populated places established in 1868
1868 establishments in the Russian Empire